Lennart Berglund (born 9 September 1936) is a retired Swedish ice hockey player. Berglund was part of the Djurgården Swedish champions' team of 1954 and 1955.

References

Swedish ice hockey players
Djurgårdens IF Hockey players
1936 births
Living people